Fritillaria involucrata is a plant species native to the Alps of southeastern France and northwestern Italy.

References

External links
Sharnoff Photos, Flowers of Provence, Fritillaria involucrata 
Société Françoise des Iris et des Plantes bulbeuses, Fritillaria involucrata All. Sur la Montagne de la Sainte-Victoire in French with color photos
Free  Nature Images, Fritillaria involucrata

involucrata
Flora of France
Flora of Italy
Plants described in 1789
Taxa named by Carlo Allioni